Stuart Edgar Sharratt (born 26 February 1942) is an English former football goalkeeper who made 152 league and cup appearances for Port Vale between 1966 and 1972. He previously played for West Bromwich Albion, Nantwich Town, and Oswestry Town.

Career
Stuart played for Ball Haye Green, Padgate Teacher Training College, West Bromwich Albion, Nantwich Town and Oswestry Town, before joining Jackie Mudie's Port Vale for £2,000 in March 1966. He was favoured ahead of the ageing Jimmy O'Neill and the inexperienced David Ikin, and played 15 Fourth Division games at the end of the 1965–66 season. He played 49 of the club's 50 games in the 1966–67 campaign, beating off competition from young hopeful Billy McNulty. Sharrat was an ever-present during the 49 game 1967–68 season. In March 1968, manager Stanley Matthews arranged a £15,000 transfer to Huddersfield Town, however Sharratt refused the move. However injury struck on 14 August 1968 as he cracked a kneecap in a 2–0 defeat at Wrexham in the first round of the League Cup, later contracting a virus in his blood. Upon his recovery he became a part-time player and barely got a game, though he did play instead of Keith Ball in 18 Third Division games in the 1970–71 season, and went on to feature 18 times in the 1971–72 season. His contract was terminated by manager Gordon Lee in May 1972 because he was unable to get release from his work as a college lecturer to play in a testimonial game. He appealed and the club were forced by the Football League to honour his contract to 30 June 1972.

Post-retirement
Stuart increasingly attended Vale matches as a supporter from 1986. In 2015, he underwent surgery to treat a brain tumor.

Career statistics
Source:

References

1942 births
Living people
Sportspeople from Leek, Staffordshire
English footballers
Association football goalkeepers
West Bromwich Albion F.C. players
Nantwich Town F.C. players
Oswestry Town F.C. players
Port Vale F.C. players
English Football League players
Schoolteachers from Staffordshire